Anarchism in Spain has historically gained some support and influence, especially before Francisco Franco's victory in the Spanish Civil War of 1936–1939, when it played an active political role and is considered the end of the golden age of classical anarchism.

There were several variants of anarchism in Spain, namely expropriative anarchism in the period leading up to the conflict, the peasant anarchism in the countryside of Andalusia; urban anarcho-syndicalism in Catalonia, particularly its capital Barcelona; and what is sometimes called "pure" anarchism in other cities such as Zaragoza. However, these were complementary trajectories and had many ideological similarities. Early on, the success of the anarchist movement was sporadic. Anarchists would organize a strike and ranks would swell. Usually, repression by police reduced the numbers again, but at the same time further radicalized many strikers.

In the 20th century, this violence began to fade, and the movement gained speed with the rise of anarcho-syndicalism and the creation of the huge libertarian trade union, the Confederación Nacional del Trabajo (CNT). General strikes became common, and large portions of the Spanish working class adopted anarchist ideas. The  (FAI) was created as a purely anarchist association, with the intention of keeping the CNT focused on the principles of anarchism.

Anarchists played a central role in the fight against Francisco Franco during the Spanish Civil War. At the same time, a far-reaching social revolution spread throughout Spain, where land and factories were collectivized and controlled by the workers. All remaining social reforms ended in 1939 with the victory of Franco, who had thousands of anarchists executed. Resistance to his rule never entirely died, with resilient militants participating in acts of sabotage and other direct action after the war, and making several attempts on the ruler's life. Their legacy remains important to this day, particularly to anarchists who look at their achievements as a historical precedent of anarchism's validity.

History

Beginning 

In the mid-19th century, revolutionary ideas were generally unknown in Spain. There was a history of peasant unrest in some parts of the country, but this was not related to any political movement, rather it was borne out of circumstances. The same was true in the cities; long before workers were familiar with anarcho-syndicalism, there were general strikes and other conflicts between workers and their employers.

The closest thing to a radical movement was found amongst the followers of the ideas laid out by the French anarchist Pierre-Joseph Proudhon. Mutualism had a considerable influence on the Spanish cooperativist movement, which advocated for a peaceful and gradualist approach to defeating capitalism, as well as the federalist movement, which envisioned a society of local municipalities joining together and coordinating without any need for a centralized government. The most influential proponent of mutualism in Spain was the federal republican Francesc Pi i Margall (named, upon his death, "the wisest of the federalists, almost an anarchist" by anarchist thinker Ricardo Mella), who in his book  wrote that "every man who has power over another is a tyrant" and called for the "division and subdivision of power". Another disciple of Proudhon was Ramón de la Sagra, who founded the world's first anarchist journal , which was published for a brief time in Galicia. Mutualism subsequently gained widespread popularity throughout Spain, becoming the dominant tendency within the Spanish federal republican movement by the 1860s. It was around this time that the revolutionary socialist ideas of Mikhail Bakunin, based in collectivism, a focus on direct action and a militant anti-clericalism, also began to rise to prominence in Spain.

The earliest successful attempt to introduce anarchism to the Spanish masses was undertaken by a middle-aged Italian revolutionary named Giuseppe Fanelli. An early partisan of the Young Italy movement, during the Italian Revolution Fanelli had given up his career to participate in the Risorgimento under the command of Giuseppe Garibaldi and Giuseppe Mazzini. After the proclamation of the unified Kingdom of Italy in 1861, Fanelli was elected to the Italian Parliament as part of Mazzini's far-left coalition, before meeting Bakunin and becoming an anarchist. 

Bakunin took this as an opportunity to sponsor Fanelli on a journey to Spain in order to recruit members for the International Workingmen's Association (IWA), an international organization that aimed to unify groups working for the benefit of the working class. Arriving in Barcelona on a shoestring budget, Fanelli met with and borrowed money from Élie Reclus, in order to finance his trip to Madrid, where he met with the owner of the federal republican newspaper  and was put in touch with a group of radical workers.

Fanelli spoke in French and Italian, so those present could only understand bits of what he was saying, except for one man, Tomás González Morago, who knew French. Nevertheless, Fanelli was able to convey his libertarian and anti-capitalist ideas to the audience. Anselmo Lorenzo gave an account of his oratory: "His voice had a metallic tone and was susceptible to all the inflexions appropriate to what he was saying, passing rapidly from accents of anger and menace against tyrants and exploiters to take on those of suffering, regret and consolation...we could understand his expressive mimicry and follow his speech." These workers, longing for something more than the mild radicalism of the day, became the core of the Spanish Anarchist movement, quickly spreading "the Idea" across Spain. The oppressed and marginalized working classes were very susceptible to an ideology attacking institutions they perceived to be oppressive, namely the state, capitalism and organized religion.

As a result, all the workers that were present at the meeting declared themselves in support of the International and Fanelli subsequently extended his stay in the city, holding "propaganda sessions" with the nascent anarchist adherents - paying particular attention to Anselmo Lorenzo. On January 24, 1869, Fanelli held his last meeting with the anarchist workers of Madrid, in which they declared the establishment of the Madrid section of the IWA. Fanelli explained his decision to leave Spain was so that the anarchists there could develop themselves and their groups "by their own efforts, with their own values," in order to maintain spontaneity, plurality and individuality within the workers' movement. The anarchists of the Madrid section subsequently began to spread their ideas by holding meetings, giving speeches, and publishing their newspaper . By 1870, the Madrid chapter of the International had gained roughly 2,000 members.

Fanelli then returned to Barcelona where he held another meeting, attracting a number of more radical students such as Rafael Farga i Pellicer to the idea of anarchism, which subsequently gained a much larger following in Barcelona, already a bastion of proletarian rebellion, Luddism, and trade unionism. In May 1869, Farga i Pellicer spearheaded the establishment of the Barcelona section of the IWA, which began to advocate for socialism within the structures that had already been set up by the 1868 Barcelona Workers' Congress. The IWA's influence was thereby extended to a number of workers' societies and the federal republican newspaper La Federación, quickly bringing thousands of workers under the anarchist banner. Farga i Pellicer even went on to participate in the International's Basel Congress as a delegate for the Spanish sections, where he joined Bakunin's "International Alliance of Socialist Democracy".

Anarchism had soon taken root throughout Spain, in villages and in cities, and in scores of autonomous organizations. Many of the rural  were already anarchic in structure prior to the spread of "anarchist" ideas. In February 1870, the Madrid section of the IWA published in  a call for all Spanish sections to convene a national workers' congress, which was eventually decided would be held in Barcelona.

The agenda was closely guided by the anarchists around Rafael Farga i Pellicer, who opened the congress with a declaration against the state and proposed an distinctly anarchist program for the Spanish Regional Federation of the IWA (FRE-AIT). Despite the clear dominance of anarchism within the Congress, there also existed three other main tendencies: the "associatarians" that were interested in the cultivation of cooperatives, the "politicians" that wanted to mobilize workers to participate in elections, and the "pure-and-simple" trade unionists that were focused on immediate workplace struggles. There was a particularly sharp conflict between the anarchists, who advocated for abstentionism and direct action, and the "politicians", during which congress took a line of compromise regarding electoralism: allowing individual members to participate in elections if they wished, but also committing itself officially to abstentionism and anti-statism. Congress also adopted a "dual structure" for the FRE-AIT whereby workers would be organized into both trade unions based on their profession and local federations based on their location, which could then federate together from the bottom-up, laying an anti-bureaucratic and decentralist foundation for syndicalism in Spain. 

Socialists and liberals within the Spanish Federation sought to reorganize Spain in 1871 into five trade sections with various committees and councils. Many anarchists within the group felt that this was contrary to their belief in decentralization. A year of conflict ensued, in which the anarchists fought the "Authoritarians" within the Federation and eventually expelled them in 1872. In the same year, Mikhail Bakunin was expelled from the International by the Marxists, who were the majority. Anarchists, seeing the hostility from previous allies on the Left, reshaped the nature of their movement in Spain. The Spanish Federation became decentralized, now dependent on action from rank-and-file workers rather than bureaucratic councils; that is, a group structured according to anarchist principles.

Early turmoil of 1873–1900 
In the region of Alcoy, workers struck in 1873 for the eight-hour day following much agitation from the anarchists. The conflict turned to violence when police fired on an unarmed crowd, which caused workers to storm City Hall in response. Dozens were dead on each side when the violence ended. Sensational stories were made up by the press about atrocities that never took place: priests crucified, men doused in gasoline and set on fire, etc. The events became known as the Petroleum Revolution.

This was followed by the Cantonal Rebellion during which several independent cantons rose up against the First Spanish Republic. Anarchism had a considerable influence in this series of insurrections especially in the Canton of Cartagena which was the only canton to last more than a few days.

The government quickly moved to suppress the Spanish Federation. Meeting halls were shut down, members jailed, publications banned. Until around the start of the 20th century, proletarian anarchism remained relatively fallow in Spain.

However, anarchist ideas still remained popular in the rural countryside, where destitute peasants waged a lengthy series of unsuccessful rebellions in attempts to create "libertarian communism". Throughout the 1870s, the Spanish Federation drew most of its members from the peasant areas of Andalusia after the decline of its urban following. In the early 1870s, a section of the International was formed in Córdoba, forming a necessary link between the urban and rural movements.

These small gains were largely destroyed by State repression, which by the mid-1870s had forced the entire movement underground. The Spanish Federation faded away, and conventional trade unionism for a while began to replace revolutionary action, although anarchists remained abundant and their ideas not forgotten; the liberal nature of this period was perhaps borne out of despair rather than disagreement with revolutionary ideas.

Six people died in June 1896 when a bomb was thrown at the Corpus Christi procession in Barcelona. Police attributed the act to anarchists who met with the severest repression. As many as 400 people were brought to the dungeons of the castle of Montjuich in Barcelona. International outrage followed reports that the prisoners were brutally tortured: men hanged from ceilings, genitals twisted and burned, fingernails ripped out. Several died before being brought to trial, and five were eventually executed. The Italian anarchist Michele Angiolillo assassinated the Spanish Prime Minister Antonio Cánovas in 1897, in part as retaliation for the repression in Barcelona.

The anarchist idea was propagated by many periodicals like  started by Fermín Salvochea. Salvochea is considered one of the earliest pioneers in the propagation and organization along anarchist lines.

Rise of the CNT 
The anarchist movement lacked a stable national organization in its early years. Anarchist Juan Gómez Casas discusses the evolution of anarchist organization before the creation of the CNT: "After a period of dispersion, the Federation of Workers of the Spanish Region disappeared, to be replaced by the Anarchist Organization of the Spanish Region.... This organization then changed, in 1890, into the Solidarity and Assistance Pact, which was itself dissolved in 1896 because of repressive legislation against anarchism and broke into many nuclei and autonomous workers' societies....

There was a consensus amongst anarchists in the early 20th century that a new, national labor organization was needed to bring coherency and strength to their movement. During this congress, a resolution was passed declaring that the purpose of the CNT would be to "hasten the integral economic emancipation of the entire working class through the revolutionary expropriation of the bourgeoisie...." The CNT started off fairly small, with about 30,000 members across various unions and confederations.

The national confederation was split into smaller regional ones, which were again broken down into smaller trade unions. Despite this many-tiered structure, bureaucracy was consciously avoided. Initiatives for decisions came largely from the individual unions. There were no paid officials; all positions were staffed by common workers. Decisions made by the national delegations did not have to be followed. The CNT was in these respects quite different from the comparatively rigid socialist unions.

A general strike was called a mere five days after its founding by triumphant, and perhaps overzealous, workers. It spread across several cities throughout Spain; in one city, workers took over the community and killed the mayor. Troops moved into all major cities and the strike was quickly crushed. The CNT was declared an illegal organization, and thus went underground only a week after its founding. A few years later it continued with overt strike actions, as in the general strike organized in tandem with the Socialist-dominated UGT (a rare occurrence, as the two groups were usually at odds) to protest the rising cost of living.

CNT following World War I 
Spain's economy suffered upon the decline of the wartime economy. Factories closed, unemployment soared and wages declined. Expecting class conflict, especially in light of the then recent Russian Revolution, much of the capitalist class began a bitter war against unions, particularly the CNT. Lockouts became more frequent. Known militants were blacklisted. , or assassins, were hired to kill union leaders. Scores, perhaps hundreds, of anarchists were murdered during this time period. Anarchists responded in turn with a number of assassinations, the most famous of which is the murder of Prime Minister Eduardo Dato Iradier.

The CNT, by this time, had as many as a million members. It retained its focus on direct action and syndicalism; this meant that revolutionary currents in Spain were no longer on the fringe, but very much in the mainstream. While it would be false to say that the CNT was entirely anarchist, the prevailing sentiment undoubtedly leaned in that direction. Every member elected to the "National Committee" was an overt anarchist. Most rank and file members espoused anarchist ideas. Indeed, much of Spain seemed to be radiant with revolutionary fervor; along with waves of general strikes (as well as mostly successful strikes with specific demands), it was not uncommon to see anarchist literature floating around ordinary places or common workers discussing revolutionary ideas. One powerful opponent from the upper classes (Diaz del Moral) claims that "the total working population" was overcome with the spirit of revolt, that "all were agitators."

Whereas anarchism in Spain was previously disjointed and ephemeral, even the smallest of towns now had organizations and took part in the movement. Different parts of the CNT (unions, regions, etc.) were autonomous and yet inextricably linked. A strike by workers in one field would often lead to solidarity strikes by workers in an entire city. This way, general strikes often were not "called", they simply happened organically.

General strike of 1919 
Employers immediately attempted to respond militantly, but the strike had spread much too rapidly. Employees at another plant staged a sit-in supporting their fellow workers. About a week later, all textile employees walked out. Soon after, almost all electrical workers went on strike as well.

Barcelona was placed under martial law, yet the strike continued in full force. The union of newspaper printers warned the newspaper owners in Barcelona that they would not print anything critical of the strikers. The Government in Madrid tried to destroy the strike by calling up all workers for military service, but this call was not heeded, as it was not even printed in the paper. When the call got to Barcelona by word of mouth, the response was yet another strike by all railway and trolley workers.

The Government in Barcelona finally managed to settle the strike, which had effectively crippled the Catalan economy. All of the striking workers demanded an eight-hour day, union recognition, and the rehiring of fired workers. All demands were granted. It was also demanded that all political prisoners be released. The government agreed, but refused to release those currently on trial. Workers responded with shouts of "Free everybody!" and warned that the strike would continue in three days if this demand was not met. Sure enough, this is what occurred. However, members of the Strike Committee and many others were immediately arrested and police effectively stopped the second strike from reaching great proportions.

The Government tried to appease the workers, who were clearly on the verge of insurrection. Tens of thousands of unemployed workers were returned to their jobs. The eight-hour day was declared for all workers. Thus, Spain became the first country in the world to pass a national eight-hour day law, as a result of 1919's general strike.

After the 1919 general strike, increasing violence against CNT organizers, combined with the rise of the Primo de Rivera dictatorship (which banned all anarchist organizations and publications), created a lull in anarchist activity. Many anarchists responded to police violence by becoming  themselves. This was a period of mutual violence, in which anarchist groups including  assassinated political opponents. Many anarchists were killed by gunmen of the other side.

FAI 
During the Primo de Rivera years, much of the CNT leadership began to espouse a "moderate" revolutionary syndicalism, ostensibly holding an anarchist outlook but holding that the fulfilment of anarchist hopes would not come immediately, and insisting on the need for a more disciplined and organised trade-union movement in order to work towards libertarian communism. The  (FAI) was formed in 1927 to combat this tendency.

Its organization was based on autonomous affinity groups. The FAI remained a very secretive organization, even after acknowledging its existence two years after its formation. Its surreptitious nature makes it difficult to judge the extent of its membership. Estimates of FAI membership at the time immediately preceding the revolution range from 5,000 to 30,000. Membership dramatically increased during the first few months of the Civil War.

The FAI was not ideally libertarian, being dominated by very aggressive militants such as Juan García Oliver and Buenaventura Durruti. However, it was not authoritarian in its actual methods; it allowed freedom of dissent to its members. In fact the overall organization of the FAI was very loose, unlike Bakunin's "Alliance" which was, however, an important precedent in creating an organization for pushing forward anarchist ideology.

The FAI was militantly revolutionary, with actions including bank robberies to acquire funds, and the organization of general strikes, but at times became more opportunist. It supported moderate efforts against the Rivera dictatorship, and in 1936, contributed to establishment of the Popular Front. By the time the anarchist organizations began cooperating with the Republican government, the FAI essentially became a de facto political party and the affinity group model was dropped, not uncontroversially.

Fall of Rivera and the Second Republic 
The CNT initially welcomed the Republic as a preferable alternative to dictatorship, while still holding on to the principle that all states are inherently deleterious, if perhaps to varying degrees of severity.

This relationship did not last long, though. A strike by telephone workers led to street fighting between CNT and government forces; the army used machine guns against the workers. A similar strike broke out a few weeks later in Seville; twenty anarchists were killed and one hundred were wounded after the army besieged a CNT meeting place and destroyed it with artillery. An insurrection occurred in Alt Llobregat, where miners took over the town and raised red and black flags in town halls. These actions provoked harsh government repression and achieved little tangible success. Some of the most active anarchists, including Buenaventura Durruti and Francisco Ascaso, were deported to Spanish territory in Africa. This provoked protest and an insurrection in Terrassa, where, like in Alto Llobregat, workers stormed town halls and raised their flags. Another failed insurrection took place in 1933, when anarchist groups attacked military barracks with the hope that those inside would support them. The government had already learned of these plans, however, and quickly suppressed the revolt.

None of these actions had any success. They resulted in thousands of jailed anarchists and a wounded movement. At the same time, infighting between the syndicalist  and the insurrectionalist FAI hurt the unity of the anarchist struggle.

Prelude to revolution 

The national focus on Republic and reform led the anarchists to cry "Before the ballot boxes, social revolution!" In their view, liberal electoral reforms were futile and undesirable, and impeded the total liberation of the working classes.

An uprising took place in December 1933. Aside from a prison break in Barcelona, no gains were made by revolutionaries before the police quelled the revolt in Catalonia and most of the rest of the country. Zaragoza saw ephemeral insurrection in the form of street fighting and the occupation of certain buildings.

An important strike took place in April, again in Zaragoza. It lasted five weeks, shutting down most of Zaragoza's economy. Other parts of the country were supportive; anarchists in Barcelona took care of the strikers' children (about 13,000 of them) while the CNT federation of Logroño had offered to take care of as many as 5,000.

Asturias 

The Asturian miners' strike of 1934 began with attacks on barracks of the Civil Guard. In the town of Mieres, police barracks and the town hall were taken over. Strikers moved on, continuing to occupy towns, even the capital of Asturias in Oviedo. Workers had control over most of Asturias, under chants of "Unity, Proletarian brothers!" The ports of Gijón and Avilés remained open. Anarchist militants defending against the imminent arrival of government troops were denied sufficient arms by suspicious communists. So fell the uprising, with great violence upon the rebels, but also with great unity and revolutionary fervor amongst the working classes.

The crushing of the revolt was led by General Francisco Franco, who would later lead a rebellion against the republic and become dictator of Spain. The use of the Foreign Legion and the Moorish  to kill Spaniards caused public outrage. Captured miners faced torture, rape, mutilation, and execution. This foreshadowed the same brutality seen two years later in the Spanish Civil War.

Popular Front 
With the growth of right-wing political parties (Gil Robles' conservative Spanish Confederation of the Autonomous Right, for example), leftist parties felt the need to join together in a "Popular Front." This included Republicans, Socialists, Communists, and other left parties; Anarchists were not willing to support it but refused to attack it, either, thus helping it get into power.

The more radical elements of the CNT-FAI were not satisfied with electoral politics. In the months after the Popular Front's rise to power, strikes, demonstrations, and rebellions broke out throughout Spain. Throughout the countryside, almost 5 km2 of land were taken over by squatters. The Popular Front parties began to lose control. Anarchists would continue to strike even when prudent socialists called it off, taking food from stores when strike funds ran out.

The CNT's national congress in May 1936 had an overtly revolutionary tone. Among the topics discussed were sexual freedom, plans for agrarian communes, and the elimination of social hierarchy.

Individualist anarchism 

Spanish individualist anarchism was influenced by American individualist anarchism but it was mainly connected to the French currents. At the start of the 20th century people such as Dorado Montero, Ricardo Mella, Federico Urales, Mariano Gallardo and J. Elizalde translated French and American individualists. The most influential thinkers there were Max Stirner, Émile Armand and Han Ryner. Just as in France, Esperanto, anationalism, anarcho-naturism and free love were present as philosophies and practices within Spanish individualist anarchist circles. Later Armand and Ryner started publishing in the Spanish individualist press. Armand's concept of amorous camaraderie had an important role in motivating polyamory as realization of the individual.

Diez reports that the Spanish individualist anarchist press was widely read by members of anarcho-communist groups and by members of the anarcho-syndicalist trade union CNT. There were also the cases of prominent individualist anarchists such as Federico Urales and Miguel Giménez Igualada who were members of the CNT and J. Elizalde who was a founding member and first secretary of the Iberian Anarchist Federation.

An important Spanish individualist anarchist was Miguel Giménez Igualada who wrote the lengthy theory book called Anarchism espousing his individualist anarchism. Between October 1937 and February 1938 he started as editor of the individualist anarchist magazine , in which many works of Han Ryner and Émile Armand appeared, and also participated in the publishing of another individualist anarchist magazine . In his youth he engaged in illegalist activities. Igualada's thought was deeply influenced by Stirner, of which he was the main popularizer in Spain through his writings. He published and wrote the preface to the fourth edition in Spanish of The Ego and Its Own from 1900. He proposed the creation of a Union of Egoists, a Federation of Individualist Anarchists in Spain, but did not succeed. In 1956, Igualada published an extensive treatise on Stirner, which he dedicated to fellow individualist anarchist Émile Armand. Afterwards, he travelled and lived in Argentina, Uruguay and Mexico.

Anarcho-naturism 

Isaac Puente, an influential Spanish anarchist during the 1920s and 1930s and an important propagandist of anarcho-naturism, was a militant of both the CNT anarcho-syndicalist trade union and Iberian Anarchist Federation.  He published the book  (en:Libertarian Communism and other insurrectionary and naturist proclaims) in 1933, which sold around 100,000 copies, and wrote the final document for the Extraordinary Confederal Congress of Zaragoza of 1936 which established the main political line for the CNT for that year. Puente was a doctor who approached his medical practice from a naturist point of view. He saw naturism as an integral solution for the working classes, alongside Neo-Malthusianism, and believed it concerned the living being while anarchism addressed the social being. He believed capitalist societies endangered the well-being of humans from both a socioeconomic and sanitary viewpoint, and promoted anarcho-communism alongside naturism as a solution.

The "relation between Anarchism and Naturism gives way to the Naturist Federation, in July 1928, and to the lV Spanish Naturist Congress, in September 1929, both supported by the Libertarian Movement. However, in the short term, the Naturist and Libertarian movements grew apart in their conceptions of everyday life. The Naturist movement felt closer to the Libertarian individualism of some French theoreticians such as Henri Ner (real name of Han Ryner) than to the revolutionary goals proposed by some Anarchist organisations such as the FAI, (Federación Anarquista Ibérica)". This ecological tendency in Spanish anarchism was strong enough as to call the attention of the CNT–FAI in Spain. Daniel Guérin in Anarchism: From Theory to Practice reports:

Anarchist presence in the Spanish Civil War 

The Republican government responded to the threat of a military uprising with remarkable timidity and inaction. The CNT had warned Madrid of a rising based in Morocco months earlier and even gave the exact date and time of 5 am on July 19, which it had learned through its impressive espionage apparatus. Yet, the Popular Front did nothing, and refused to give arms to the CNT. Tired of begging for weapons and being denied, CNT militants raided an arsenal and doled out arms to the unions. Militias were placed on alert days before the planned rising.

The rising was actually moved forward two days to July 17, and was crushed in areas heavily defended by anarchist militants, such as Barcelona. Some anarchist strongholds, such as Zaragoza, fell, to the great dismay of those in Catalonia; this is possibly due to the fact that they were being told that there was no "desperate situation" by Madrid and thus did not prepare. The Government still remained in a state of denial, even saying that the "Nationalist" forces had been crushed in places where it had not been. It is largely because of the militancy on the part of the unions, both anarchist and communist, that the Rebel forces did not win the war immediately.

Anarchist militias were remarkably libertarian within themselves, particularly in the early part of the war before being partially absorbed into the regular army. They had no rank system, no hierarchy, no salutes, and those called "Commanders" were elected by the troops.

The most effective anarchist unit was the Durruti Column, led by militant Buenaventura Durruti. It was the only anarchist unit which managed to gain respect from otherwise fiercely hostile political opponents. In a section of her memoirs which otherwise lambastes the anarchists, Dolores Ibárruri states: "The war developed with minimal participation from the anarchists in its fundamental operations. One exception was Durruti..." (Memorias de Dolores Ibarruri, p. 382). The column began with 3,000 troops, but at its peak was made up of about 8,000 men. They had a difficult time getting arms from a fearful Republican government, so Durruti and his men compensated by seizing unused arms from government stockpiles. Durruti's death on November 20, 1936, weakened the Column in spirit and tactical ability; they were eventually incorporated, by decree, into the regular army. Over a quarter of the population of Barcelona attended Durruti's funeral. It is still uncertain how Durruti died; modern historians tend to agree that it was an accident, perhaps a malfunction with his own gun or a result of friendly fire, but widespread rumors at the time claimed treachery by his men; anarchists tended to claim that he died heroically and was shot by a fascist sniper. Given the widespread repression against Anarchists by the Soviets, which included torture and summary executions, it is also possible that it was a USSR plot.

Another famous unit was the Iron Column, made up of ex-convicts and other "disinherited" Spaniards sympathetic to the Revolution. The Republican government denounced them as "uncontrollables" and "bandits", but they had a fair amount of success in battle. In March 1937 they were incorporated into the regular army.

CNT–FAI collaboration with government during the war 
In 1936, the CNT decided, after several refusals, to collaborate with the government of Largo Caballero. Juan García Oliver became Minister of Justice (where he abolished legal fees and had all criminal dossiers destroyed), Diego Abad de Santillán became Minister of the Economy, and Federica Montseny became Minister of Health, to name a few instances.

During the Spanish Civil War, many anarchists outside of Spain criticized the CNT leadership for entering into government and compromising with communist elements on the Republican side. Those in Spain felt that this was a temporary adjustment, and that once Franco was defeated, they would continue in their libertarian ways. There was also concern with the growing power of authoritarian communists within the government. Montseny later explained: "At that time we only saw the reality of the situation created for us: the communists in the government and ourselves outside, the manifold possibilities, and all our achievements endangered."

Some anarchists outside of Spain viewed their concessions as necessary considering the grim possibility of losing everything should the fascists win the war. Emma Goldman said: "With Franco at the gate of Madrid, I could hardly blame the CNT–FAI for choosing a lesser evil: participation in government rather than dictatorship, the most deadly evil."

Spanish Revolution of 1936 

Along with the fight against fascism, there was a profound anarchist revolution throughout Spain. Much of Spain's economy was put under worker control. In anarchist strongholds such as Catalonia, the figure was as high as 75%, but lower in areas with heavy socialist influence. Factories were run through worker committees, agrarian areas became collectivized and run as libertarian communes. Even places like hotels, barber shops, and restaurants were collectivized and managed by their workers. 

The anarchist held areas were run according to the basic principle of "From each according to his ability, to each according to his need." In some places, money was entirely eliminated, to be replaced with vouchers. Numerous sources attest that industrial productivity doubled almost everywhere across the country and agricultural yields being "30–50%" larger, demonstrated by Emma Goldman, Augustin Souchy, Chris Ealham, Eddie Conlon, Daniel Guerin and others. Of the resulting industrial output, Republican military commander Vicente Rojo Lluch said "Notwithstanding lavish expenditures of money on this need, our industrial organization was not able to finish a single kind of rifle or machine gun or cannon."

Anarchic communes often produced more than before the collectivization. Yields were increased by as much as 50% as a result of newly applied scientific methods. However critics often dispute these claims. Currency remained in use as a 'family wage' in some areas, while in other areas the use of currency was abolished. The newly liberated zones worked on entirely socialist libertarian principles; decisions were made through councils of ordinary citizens without any sort of bureaucracy. (The CNT-FAI leadership was at this time not nearly as radical as the rank and file members responsible for these sweeping changes.)

Franco years 

When Francisco Franco took power in 1939, he had tens of thousands of political dissidents executed. The total number of politically motivated killings between 1939 and 1943 is estimated to be around 200,000. Forced labor camps were opened up, where, according to historian Antony Beevor, "the system was probably as bad as in Germany or Russia." Despite these actions, underground resistance to Franco's rule lingered for decades. Actions by the Resistance included, among other things, sabotage, releasing prisoners, underground organizing of workers, aiding fugitives and refugees, and assassinations of government officials.

Little attention was paid to the Spaniards who refused to accept Franco's rule, even by those who had been against him during the war. Miguel García García, an anarchist jailed for twenty-two years, describes their circumstances in his 1972 book: "When we lost the war, those who fought on became the Resistance. But to the world, the Resistance had become criminals, for Franco made the laws, even if, when dealing with political opponents, he chose to break the laws established by the constitution; and the world still regards us as criminals. When we are imprisoned, liberals are not interested, for we are 'terrorists'".

The guerilla resistance (referred to in Spain as Maquis) was effectively ended around 1960 with the death of many of its more experienced militants. In the period from the end of the war until 1960, according to government sources, there were 1,866 clashes with security forces and 535 acts of sabotage. 2,173 guerillas were killed and 420 were wounded, while the figures for government forces lost amount to only 307 killed and 372 wounded. 19,340 resistance fighters were arrested over this time interval. Those who aided the guerillas were met with similar brutality; as many as 20,000 were arrested over the years on this charge, with many facing torture during interrogation.

The Spanish government under Franco continued to prosecute criminals until its demise. In the earlier years, some prisons were filled up to fourteen times their capacity, with prisoners hardly able to move about. People were often locked up simply for carrying a union card. Active militants were often less fortunate; thousands were shot or hanged. Two of the most able Resistance fighters, Jose Luis Facerias and Francisco Sabater Llopart (often called Sabaté), were simply shot by police forces; many anarchists met a similar fate.

The then-underground CNT was also involved. In 1962, a secret Interior Defense section was formed to coordinate actions of the resistance.

The Anarchist Black Cross was re-activated in the late 1960s by Albert Meltzer and Stuart Christie to help anarchist prisoners during Franco's reign. In 1969, Miguel García García became International Secretary of the ABC.

Today 

The CNT is still active today. Their influence, however, is limited. The CGT is much larger, with perhaps 50,000 members (although it represents as many as two million workers), and is currently the third largest union in Spain. CGT has an important number of representatives in, for example, SEAT, the Spanish car manufacturer and still the largest enterprise in Catalonia and also in the public railroad system, e.g., it holds the majority in Barcelona's underground. The CNT–CGT split has made it impossible for the government to give back the unions' important facilities that belonged to them before Franco's regime seized them and used them for their only legal trade union, a devolution also still pending in part for some of the other historical political parties and worker organizations.

During the first years of the 2000s, the Iberian Federation of Libertarian Youth in Spain started to adopt insurrectionary anarchist ideals, and distancing from anarcho-syndicalism became more prevalent due to the influence of black blocs in alterglobalization protests and examples of anarchist insurrection from Italy and Greece. However, around 2002 - 2003 it was subject to state repression, driving it into inactivity.

A new generation of anarchist youth decided to re-establish the FIJL in 2006, deviating from its predecessor in identifying as a formal organisation (something insurrectionary anarchism disavows), as well as being sympathetic to anarcho-syndicalism, although this did not prevent it from criticizing institutions such as the CNT. In the year 2007 it claimed itself to be the direct continuation of the previous FIJL, since it did not have news from the insurrectionist organization. However, after the publishing of a communique by FIJL, it rebranded itself the "Iberian Federation of Anarchist Youth" ( or FIJA), still claiming to be descended from, and continuing in the spirit of, 90s FIJL. They publish a newspaper called  (The Bellows).

In March 2012, the insurrectionist FIJL of the 1990s announced its dissolution, and so FIJA reclaimed the FIJL name. Today, the FIJL has presence in Asturias, Cádiz, Donosti, Granada, Lorca (Murcia) and Madrid.

Violence 

Although many anarchists were opposed to the use of force, some militants did use violence and terrorism to further their agendas. This "propaganda of the deed" first became popular in the late 19th century. This was before the rise of syndicalism as an anarchist tactic, and after a long history of police repression that led many to despair.

Los Desheredados (English translation: "the Disinherited"), were a secret group advocating violence and said to be behind a number of murders. Another group,  (Black Hand), was also rumoured to be behind various assassinations and bombings, although there is some evidence that the group was a sensational myth created by police in the Civil Guard, notorious for their brutality; in fact, it is well known that police invented actions by their enemies, or carried them out themselves, as a tool of repression.  and Agrupación de los Amigos de Durruti (Friends of Durruti) were other groups that used violence as a political weapon. The former group was responsible for the robbery of Banco de Bilbao which gained 300,000 pesetas, and the assassination of the Cardinal Archbishop of Zaragoza Juan Soldevilla y Romero, who was reviled as a particularly reactionary cleric.  stopped using violence with the end of the Primo de Rivera dictatorship, when anarchists had more opportunities to work aboveground.

In later years, anarchists were responsible for a number of church burnings throughout Spain. The Church, a powerful, usually right-wing political force in Spain, was always hated by anti-authoritarians. At this time, their influence was not as grand as in the past, but a rise of anti-Christian sentiment coincided with their perceived or real support of fascism. Many of the burnings were not committed by anarchists. However, anarchists were often used as a scapegoat by the authorities.

Rarely was violence directed towards civilians. However, there are a few recorded cases in which anarchists enforced their own beliefs with violence; one observer reports incidents in which pimps and drug dealers were shot on the spot. Forced collectivization, while exceedingly rare, did occur on several occasions when ideals were dropped in favor of wartime pragmatism. In general, though, individual holdings were respected by anarchists who opposed coercive violence more vigorously than small-scale property possession.

Despite the violence of some, many anarchists in Spain adopted an ascetic lifestyle in line with their libertarian beliefs. Smoking, drinking, gambling, and prostitution were widely looked down upon. Anarchists avoided dealing with institutions they proposed to fight against: most did not enter into marriages, go to State-run schools (libertarian schools, like the Catalan Ferrer's , were popular), or attempt to aggrandize their personal wealth. This moralism starkly contrasts with the popular view of anarchists as anomic firebrands, but also is part of another stereotype that the anarchism in Spain was a millenarian pseudo-religion.

Feminism 
Feminism has historically played a role alongside the development of anarchism; Spain is no exception. The CNT's founding congress placed special emphasis on the role of women in the labor force and urged an effort to recruit them into the organization. There was also a denunciation of the exploitation of women in society and of wives by their husbands.

Women's rights had been integral in anarchist ideas such as coeducation, the abolition of marriage, and abortion rights, amongst others; these were quite radical ideas in traditionally Catholic Spain. Women had played a large part in many of the struggles, even fighting alongside their male comrades on the barricades. However, they were often marginalized; for example, women often were paid less in the agrarian collectives and had less visible roles in larger anarchist organizations.

A Spanish anarchist group known as Mujeres Libres (Free Women) provided day-care, education, maternity centers, and other services for the benefit of women. The group had a peak membership of between 20,000 and 38,000. Its first national congress, held in 1937, with delegations from over a dozen different cities representing about 115 smaller groups. The statutes of the organization declared its purpose as being "a. To create a conscious and responsible feminine force that will act as a vanguard of progress; b. To establish for this purpose schools, institutes, lectures, special courses, etc., to train the woman and emancipate her from the triple slavery to which she has been and still is submitted: the slavery of ignorance, the slavery of being a woman, and the slavery of being a worker."

Eskalera Karakola is a current squat in Madrid, Spain, which is held by feminists and works on autogestion principles. It was situated in the Lavapiés barrio from 1996 to 2005, and is now in Calle Embajador. The squat organizes activities focussing on domestic violence and women's precarity in post-industrial capitalism. In 2002, it created a Female Workers' Laboratory, and has carried out anti-racist activities, in particular with female immigrants, since 1998. Eskalera Karakola also took part in the organization of the LGBT Pride and the forum "Women and Architecture". It participated in alter-globalization events such as the European Social Forum and is part of the European nextGENDERation network. It publishes a review titled Mujeres Preokupando (Concerned Women).

See also 
 , a 1930s anarchist newspaper from Las Palmas
 La Mano Negra, an alleged violent anarchist secret society operating in Andalusia around 1880
 , a movie about anarchism in Spain by J. Gamero

References

Bibliography 

 
 
 
 
 
 .
 
 
 
 
 
 
 
 
 
 
 
 .
 
 
 
 
 
 

 
 
 
   (vol. 1);  (vol. 2);  (vol.3). all from ChristieBooks.

External links 
 Anarchism in the Spanish Revolution of 1936 - Spanish Civil War
 Spanish Anarchists Oral History Collection at the International Institute of Social History

 
Anarchism
Spain